The Bulkeley Hill Narrow Gauge Railway was a  long  gauge rope-hauled incline on the Bulkeley Hill near Bulkeley in Cheshire, England. With a grade of nearly 1:1 in one section, it is known as Cheshire's Steepest Railway.

History 
The Staffordshire Potteries Water Board was granted permission in 1937 to build drinking water pumping stations at Peckforton and Tower Wood in Cheshire with a reservoir on Bulkeley Hill, from where the water was piped to a large reservoir at Cooper's Green near Audley for distribution to Tunstall and the Potteries. After the water was pumped into the elevated reservoir, it ran in a 27-inch pipeline (ø 686 mm) to the potteries.

It has three catch points for derailing runaway vehicles. At its bottom station, five reused Lancashire boilers are available as diesel storage tanks for the pumps.

External links 
 www.woodlandtrust.org.uk/…/bulkeley-hill/

References 

2 ft gauge railways in England
Railway inclines in the United Kingdom
Rail transport in Cheshire